Llanedwen is a village in the community of Llanddaniel Fab, Ynys Môn, Wales, which is 126.5 miles (203.6 km) from Cardiff and 208.8 miles (336 km) from London.  St Edwen's Church, Llanedwen is located in the area.

References

See also 
 List of localities in Wales by population

Villages in Anglesey